Welf pudding or Guelph pudding ( or Welfenpudding), sometimes known as Hock Pudding, is a two-layered pudding from Germany. The white bottom layer is made from a cooked milk and vanilla sauce on a base of very stiffly whipped egg white. After being chilled it is then covered with a yellow layer of wine sauce made of beaten egg yolk, white wine and a little lemon juice.

Welf pudding gets its name from the colours of the House of Welf (also known as the House of Guelph), a German aristocratic family that ruled the Principality of Lüneburg in medieval times. The pudding is a culinary specialty from Lower Saxony in north Germany. It was created by a Hanoverian chef and served for the first time at the 200th anniversary of the rule of the House of Welf. It is said that it became the favourite dessert of Ernest Augustus, Elector of Hanover.

References

Bibliography

External links 
 Welfenspeise at www.chefkoch.de. Giela. .

German desserts
German puddings
Lüneburg Heath
North German cuisine
Foods with alcoholic drinks
Culture of Lower Saxony